Johannes Pieter de Frey or Freij (1 February 1770 – 1834) was a Dutch printmaker, painter and publisher.

Frey was born in Amsterdam as the younger brother of the painters Maria Christina and Aletta de Frey. The painter Jacobus Johannes Lauwers lived in his house a short while and later married Maria Christina. He became the teacher of Johannes and Aletta. 
He became known for his engravings of works of 17th-century painters.
Frey died in Paris.

References

1770 births
1834 deaths
Painters from Amsterdam
18th-century Dutch painters
18th-century Dutch male artists
Dutch male painters